Francesco Migliore (born 17 April 1988) is an Italian–French footballer.

Club career

Lyon
Born in Arezzo, Migliore began his youth career with French champions Olympique Lyonnais. He primarily played in Lyon's CFA.

Mons
Following the 2007–08 season, he went on trial with Mons and was eventually signed.

Cremonese
On 5 July 2018, he joined Serie B club Cremonese on a two-year contract.

References

External links
 Mons Profile

1988 births
Living people
Italian footballers
French footballers
Association football defenders
Olympique Lyonnais players
R.A.E.C. Mons players
Giulianova Calcio players
Spezia Calcio players
Genoa C.F.C. players
U.S. Cremonese players
Belgian Pro League players
Serie A players
Serie B players
Italian expatriate sportspeople in Belgium
Italian expatriate footballers
Expatriate footballers in Belgium
People with acquired French citizenship
French people of Italian descent
French expatriate footballers
French expatriate sportspeople in Belgium
Sportspeople from Arezzo
Footballers from Tuscany